Cláudia Bueno da Silva (born ) is a Brazilian female volleyball player. She was part of the Brazil women's national volleyball team. On club level she played for Minas Tenis Clube in 2013.

Clubs
  São Caetano (2004–2008)
  Praia Clube (2008–2010)
  Minas Tênis Clube (2010–2013)
  Vôlei Amil/Campinas (2013–2014)
  SESI São Paulo (2014–2015)
  Praia Clube (2015–2018)
  Osasco/Audax (2018–2019)
  Praia Clube (2019–)

Awards

Clubs
 2015–16 Brazilian Superliga –  Runner-up, with Dentil/Praia Clube
 2017–18 Brazilian Superliga –  Champion, with Dentil/Praia Clube
 2020–21 Brazilian Superliga –  Runner-up, with Dentil/Praia Clube
 2021–22 Brazilian Superliga –  Runner-up, with Dentil/Praia Clube
 2017 South American Club Championship –  Runner-up, with Dentil/Praia Clube
 2020 South American Club Championship –  Runner-Up, with Dentil/Praia Clube
 2021 South American Club Championship –  Champion, with Dentil/Praia Clube
 2022 South American Club Championship –  Runner-Up, with Dentil/Praia Clube

References

External links
 Profile at FIVB.org

1987 births
Living people
Brazilian women's volleyball players
Place of birth missing (living people)
Setters (volleyball)